The Civil Works Administration (CWA) was a short-lived job creation program established by the New Deal during the Great Depression in the United States to rapidly create mostly manual-labor jobs for millions of unemployed workers. The jobs were merely temporary, for the duration of the hard winter of 1933–34. President Franklin D. Roosevelt unveiled the CWA on November 8, 1933, and put Harry L. Hopkins in charge of the short-term agency.

The CWA was a project created under the Federal Emergency Relief Administration (FERA). The CWA created construction jobs, mainly improving or constructing buildings and bridges. It ended on March 31, 1934, after spending $200 million a month and giving jobs to four million people.

Accomplishments
CWA workers laid 12 million feet of sewer pipe and built or improved 255,000 miles of roads, 40,000 schools, 3,700 playgrounds, and nearly 1,000 airports. The program was praised by Alf Landon, who later ran against Roosevelt in the 1936 election.

Representative of the work are one county's accomplishments in less than five months, from November 1933 to March 1934. Grand Forks County, North Dakota put 2,392 unemployed workers on its payroll at a cost of about $250,000. When the CWA began in eastern Connecticut, it could hire only 480 workers out of 1,500 who registered for jobs. Projects undertaken included work on city utility systems, public buildings, parks, and roads. Rural areas profited, with most labor being directed to roads and community schools. CWA officials gave preference to veterans with dependents, but considerable political favoritism determined which North Dakotans got jobs.

Opposition
Although the CWA provided much employment, there were critics who said there was nothing of permanent value. Roosevelt told his cabinet that this criticism moved him to end the program and replace it with the WPA which would have long-term value for the society, in addition to short-term benefits for the unemployed.

See also
 Works Progress Administration
 Civilian Conservation Corps
 Public Works Administration

References

Further reading
 Badger, Anthony J. "Doles and Jobs: Welfare." in The New Deal (Palgrave Macmillan, London, 1989) pp. 190–244.
 Bremer, William W. "Along the "American Way": The New Deal's Work Relief Programs for the Unemployed," Journal of American History Vol. 62, No. 3 (Dec., 1975), pp. 636–652 in JSTOR
 Hopkins, June. Harry Hopkins: Sudden hero, brash reformer (Springer, 2016).
 Lewis, Michael. "No Relief From Politics: Machine Bosses and Civil Works." Urban Affairs Quarterly 30.2 (1994): 210–226.
 Lyon, Edwin A. A new deal for southeastern archaeology (University of Alabama Press, 1996).
 Neumann, Todd C., Price V. Fishback, and Shawn Kantor. "The dynamics of relief spending and the private urban labor market during the New Deal." Journal of Economic History 70.1 (2010): 195–220. online
 Peters, Charles and Timothy Noah. "Wrong Harry – Four million jobs in two years? FDR did it in two months" Slate Jan. 26, 2009 online
 Schwartz, Bonnie Fox. The Civil Works Administration, 1933–1934: The Business of Emergency Employment in the New Deal (1984), a standard scholarly history
 Smith, Jason Scott. Building new deal liberalism: The political economy of public works, 1933–1956 (Cambridge University Press, 2006).
 Walker, Forrest A. The Civil Works Administration: an experiment in Federal work relief, 1933–1934 (1979), a standard scholarly history

Primary sources
 McJimsey, George, ed. FDR, Harry Hopkins, and the civil works administration (LexisNexis, 2006) 679 pages; vol 30. of the Documentary History of the Franklin D.  Roosevelt Administration
 "Report on Civil Works Administration of Alabama, Jefferson County Division, Nov. 19, 1933 –  Mar. 31, 1934" in the Birmingham Public Library's Digital Collections ''
 Four million jobs in two years? FDR did it in two months.
 1934: A New Deal for Artists" is an exhibition on the artists of the Great Depression at the Smithsonian American Art Museum
  University of Washington Libraries Digital Collections – Civil Works Administration Photographs 119 images showing work projects in King County, Washington established under the auspices of the Civil Works Administration in 1933–34.

External links
 

1933 establishments in the United States
Former United States Federal assistance programs
New Deal agencies